is a private women's college in Higashinada-ku, Kobe, Hyōgo, Japan. The predecessor of the school was founded in 1920, and it was chartered as a junior college in 1955. In 1964 it became a four-year college.

Faculties 
 Faculty of Letters
 Department of Japanese Language and Culture
 Department of English Language and Culture
 Department of Multicultural Communication
 Department of Creative Media Studies
 Faculty of Human Sciences
 Department of Psychology
 Department of Childhood Development and Education
 Department of Cultural Sociology
 Department of Human Life Environments
 Faculty of Nursing and Rehabilitation
 Department of Physical Therapy

Graduate Schools 
 Graduate School of Humanities and Human Sciences
 Master's Program in Psychology and Education
 Master's Program in Sociology, Anthropology and Environmental Studies
 Graduate School of Nursing
 Master's Program in Nursing

References

External links
 Official website 

Educational institutions established in 1920
Private universities and colleges in Japan
Konan Women's University
1920 establishments in Japan